Ribes mescalerium, called the Mescalero currant, is a shrub native to southeastern New Mexico, western Texas, and the Mexican State of Chihuahua.

Leaves are palmately lobed. Flowers are borne on a pendulent (hanging) raceme of 6-10 white flowers.

References

mescalerium
Flora of Texas
Flora of Chihuahua (state)
Flora of New Mexico
Plants described in 1900